The 2020 Mnet Asian Music Awards ceremony, organized by CJ E&M through its music channel Mnet, took place live on December 6 at the CJ ENM Contents World in Paju, South Korea with the theme, "New-Topia". The ceremony was held with no on-site audience due to the COVID-19 pandemic. The ceremony was the 22nd in the show's history.

Background 
On September 11, CJ ENM responded to reports and confirmed that the year's MAMA will still take place despite the ongoing COVID-19 Pandemic, but no additional details were announced.

On September 21, it was reported that it will take place on December 6 with no location confirmed. The ongoing COVID-19 pandemic made it impossible to hold the event in Hong Kong. It was the first time in 11 years that MAMA only took place in South Korea.

On November 24, it was reported that Song Joong-ki was set to host the ceremony.

Criteria

K-Pop Categories 
All songs that are eligible to be nominated are songs released from October 24, 2019, to October 28, 2020.

Asia Music Categories 
Artists from Japan, China, Thailand, Indonesia, India and Vietnam who've worked on songs released from October 1, 2019, to September 30, 2020.

Professional Categories 
Music experts from South Korea, Japan, China, Thailand, India, Indonesia and Vietnam who participated in music related contents released from October 1, 2019, to September 30, 2020.

Performers 
(Note: All performance were pre-recorded in order to maintain social distancing due to COVID-19 pandemic.)

Presenters 
The list of presenters was announced on December 1, 2020.

 Song Joong-ki – host, presented CJ ENM 2020 Visionary & Song of the Year 
 Byeon Woo-seok & Hwang In-youp – Best New Male & Female Artist 
 Bae Jung-nam & Lee Sun-bin – Best Dance Performance – Male and Solo & Discovery of the Year
 Lee Do-hyun & Go Bo-gyeol – Best Band Performance & Favorite Dance Performance – Female Solo
 Joo Woo-jae & Lee Yu-bi – Best of Next & Best Vocal Performance – Group
 James Corden – Album of the Year
 Gong Myung & Choi Soo-young – Worldwide Fans' Choice
 Yoo Yeon-seok & Jung Kyung-ho – Worldwide Fans' Choice
 Im Soo-jung & Lee Da-hee – Worldwide Fans' Choice
 Yang Kyung-won & Park Ha-sun – Best Stage, Favorite Dance Performance – Group & Notable Achievement Artist
 Kim Ji-suk & Im Soo-hyang – Best Music Video & Favorite Asian Artist
 Lee Sang-yeob & Park Gyu-young – Favorite Female & Male Group 
 Park Seo-joon – Worldwide Icon of the Year
 Yoon Park & Kang Han-na – Favorite Dance Performance – Male Solo & Favorite Global Performance
 Jung Moon-sung & Jeon Mi-do – Best Male Artist
 Gong Myung – BoA's 20th anniversary special & Inspired Achievement Award
 Jeon Hye-jin – Most Popular Artist
 Lee Jung-jae – Artist of the Year

Winners and nominees 
Winners are listed first and highlighted in bold. Online voting opened on the official MAMA website and Twitter an hour after the announcement of nominees on October 29, 2020. Voting ended on December 5, 2020.

Main awards

Favorite Awards

Special Awards

Professional Categories

Multiple Awards 
The following artist(s) received three or more awards:

Broadcast 
The ceremony of the 2020 Mnet Asian Music Awards was broadcast live worldwide from Mnet in South Korea to simulcast across CJ E&M channels; other international networks, and online via Mnet K-pop and KCON's YouTube account and Mnet's official website. The live red carpet broadcast was cancelled due to safety protocols against COVID-19.

Controversies

Discrimination between actors and idols
On December 8, Dispatch released a report which described that the actors who took part in the ceremony as award presenters had been given waiting rooms and catering backstage. It has been also reported that only two idol teams received waiting rooms, and the others waited in an outdoor parking lot. Although the performance was pre-recorded, the winning scene was live, so it is known that the singers who attended had to wait in the vehicle for as little as one hour and as long as six hours. Restrooms for these artists are said to have been portable toilets outside, and some idols rented other accommodations nearby rather than have to sit in their cars. A representative official from an idol group confessed, "Most of the singers have a bad waist. It is hard to sit in the car for a long time," They continued, "Some singers rented separate accommodations and waited there." A source from 2020 MAMA spoke with No Cut News. They stated that while it would have been good to have provided separate spaces for everyone, they had to follow regulations to prevent the spread of COVID-19. “We are a music show and there is absolutely no reason that we would treat singers [negligently],” they stated. On December 9, Mnet again responded, "It is because there cannot be more than 100 people in one space in the second stage of distancing due to the COVID-19 quarantine rules. It was a situation where there was insufficient space in the waiting room, and it was not discriminating between singers and actors."

Map of Indonesia
An Indonesian map was shown in the broadcast live by Mnet while publicizing the enthusiasm of K-pop around the world. Indonesia was the country that voted the most in this event excluding South Korea. However, the map displayed was false. The map showed Sumatra Island and Java Island are joined, while Bali Island and Lombok Island, which are next to Java, have disappeared. West Nusa Tenggara, East Nusa Tenggara, and Maluku were also not marked. Sulawesi and Papua are too far apart.

Map of the Philippines
During the awards show, Mnet announced the Top 5 Regions sending the most love on MAMA 2020. However, the Philippines map shown was false. The islands of Palawan, Marinduque, Mindoro, and Romblon in Luzon were missing together with the Visayas, one of the three main land groups in the Philippines. Filipino fans also complained about only accessing the live stream thru Smart Communications.

Poor working environment
On December 11, Dispatch released a report of the severe levels of dust particles that makes vision and breathing difficulties during artists' performance recordings. The '2020 MAMA' took place at the CJ ENM Contents World located in Paju, a construction site expected to be completed in 2023. According to the Paju City Hall Architecture Department, the construction progress is 30-40%. There were signs posted on the perimeter of the construction zone including "Caution: snakes", "Caution: fire hazards", and "Warning: drop hazards". Performance recordings took place in one of two completed buildings on-site, Studio 6. Each performing artist took to the stage at least two times, coming on and off the stage and the set for a duration of at least 4 hours. The reporters who visited the site noted that their throats hurting from inhaling the dust.  CJ E&M responded that it was comfortable because it was a 'new building'. "At the time of recording, 100% of the air conditioning system was operated." But representatives from the K-Pop artists claimed that there were rehearsals and pre-recordings taking place until the morning of the ceremony. "They then removed the sets used for the pre-recordings and set up the live ceremony set immediately before the event."

According to a representative from the city of Paju, CJ ENM did receive approval from the city to carry out filming in Studio 5 and Studio 6, the two completed buildings at CJ ENM Contents World. However, dust particle levels at the construction site of CJ ENM Contents World have not undergone checkups since the construction first began in 2019. The official continued, "We have not checked for fine dust separately before MAMA. There was no request at all for the related sector."

Notes

References

External links 
 Mnet Asian Music Awards official website (English)

Mnet
Mnet
MAMA Awards ceremonies